Vijay Kumar is an Indian actor, writer, director, lyricist and producer. His directorial debut, Uriyadi, a political thriller set in the 1990s, was released in 2016 to high critical acclaim and was lauded as one of the best political thrillers in Tamil cinema. His second project Uriyadi 2 released in April 2019.

Early life

Vijay was born in Chennai where he spent his schooling years. He then studied Metallurgical Engineering at the Government College of Engineering, Salem. A software engineer by profession, he quit his decade-long career in reputed companies like IBM, Infosys, Aditi Technologies, etc., to pursue his passion in cinema.

Film career

2009–2013: Career beginnings
He made a short film and applied to the Nalaya Iyakunar show in 2009, when it was in its first season. He was selected and subsequently screened two short films on the show. However, he had to leave it due to personal reasons. Vijay was a Project Lead in IBM when he quit his job to pursue his passion in filmmaking.

He moved to the United States in 2010 and began writing the script for Uriyadi in early 2011. It was initially titled Vidiyum Varai VinmeengalaaVom (V4). He spent well over a year on the script, sketching more than 2500 shots for its storyboard.

2013–present
Back in India, Vijay Kumar started his production house Souvenir Productions in April 2013. He conducted a three-month acting workshop for the actors as almost all of them were debutants.

Uriyadi was released in theaters on 27 May 2016. Upon its release, The Hindu had a chat with Vijay and cited that Uriyadi is "A throwback to the 90s".

Uriyadi 2, produced by Suriya's 2D Entertainment, directed by and starring Vijay Kumar released on 5 April 2019. He will be seen next in a youth action-drama that went on floors on 16 July 2021. It stars Vijay Kumar and Arsha in the lead and is produced by Reel Good Films. The principal photography was completed on 3 July 2022.

Further, Vijay Kumar will also play the lead in Reel Good Films' second production. The film directed by  Thamizh, has Preethi Asrani also in the lead. It also features Pavel Navageethan, George Maryan and Dileepan. It has music by Govind Vasantha. The principal photography wrapped up on 4 September 2022. Vijay Kumar has also written the dialogues of the film.

Filmography

Awards and nominations

References

External links
 
 

Tamil male actors
21st-century Tamil male actors
Living people
Tamil film directors
21st-century Indian film directors
Male actors in Tamil cinema
Male actors from Chennai
Tamil-language film directors
Film directors from Chennai
Film directors from Tamil Nadu
1987 births